Enver Nazarovich Alikhanov (April 30, 1917, in Baku – 31 July 1992) was the chairman of the Council of Ministers of the Azerbaijan Soviet Socialist Republic from 29 December 1961 to 10 April 1970. A monument to Alikhanov exists in Baku.

See also
Prime Minister of Azerbaijan

References

1917 births
1992 deaths
Politicians from Baku
Azerbaijan State Oil and Industry University alumni
Central Committee of the Communist Party of the Soviet Union candidate members
Communist Party of the Soviet Union members
Sixth convocation members of the Supreme Soviet of the Soviet Union
Seventh convocation members of the Supreme Soviet of the Soviet Union
Lenin Prize winners
Recipients of the Order of Lenin
Recipients of the Order of the Red Banner of Labour
Azerbaijani atheists
Azerbaijani politicians
Soviet military personnel of World War II from Azerbaijan
Heads of the government of the Azerbaijan Soviet Socialist Republic